Marian Goodman (born 1928) is owner of the Marian Goodman Gallery, a contemporary art gallery opened in Manhattan, New York in 1977. Goodman is one of the most respected and influential gallerists of contemporary art in the world. She is known for introducing European artists like Gerhard Richter, Joseph Beuys, and Marcel Broodthaers to the United States and has represented a number of important artists including Steve McQueen, Thomas Struth, Pierre Huyghe, Thomas Schütte, Lothar Baumgarten, Tony Cragg, Richard Deacon, Tacita Dean, Christian Boltanski, Annette Messager, Chantal Akerman, Niele Toroni, Gabriel Orozco, Maurizio Cattelan, Giuseppe Penone, Giovanni Anselmo, Jeff Wall, Rineke Dijkstra, and William Kentridge. Marian Goodman gained prominence in the art world in the 1970s and 1980s, a time when few women worked in this sector.

Early beginnings
Born Marian Geller, Goodman grew up on the Upper West Side and attended the Little Red School House and Emerson College. In 1956, Goodman was one of a group of civically engaged mothers who successfully battled Robert Moses when he tried to expand the parking lot at Tavern on the Green, forcing him to build a playground instead.

Her father, Maurice P. Geller, a first-generation Hungarian-American accountant, collected art, particularly that of Milton Avery. Goodman, herself, became an art dealer almost by accident, as a new divorcée who needed to support herself and two children. In 1962, she organized a book of cheap prints of New York paintings to raise funds for the Walden School, where her children were students.  In 1963, Goodman attended graduate school in art history at Columbia University. She was the only woman in her class.

Goodman and partners opened Multiples, dealing in artists’ editions, in 1965. Multiples published prints, multiples, and books by American artists, such as Richard Artschwager, John Baldessari, Dan Graham, Sol LeWitt, Roy Lichtenstein, Claes Oldenburg, Robert Smithson, and Andy Warhol. In 1970, the year Multiples exhibited for the first time at Art Basel, Goodman published Artists and Photographs, a 19-piece portfolio exploring the way artists such as Ed Ruscha, Christo, and Bruce Nauman were incorporating photography into their work.

From 1968 to 1975, Multiples worked with European artists, introducing early editions by Joseph Beuys, Marcel Broodthaers, Blinky Palermo, and Gerhard Richter to American audiences. Multiples also operated a space on La Cienega Boulevard on the Westside of Los Angeles for two years in the 1970s.

Marian Goodman Gallery
Goodman's failure to secure Broodthaers an outlet in New York was the impetus behind her decision to open her own gallery featuring his work as the initial exhibition. Goodman opened the Marian Goodman Gallery on East Fifty-seventh Street in 1977. (Unfortunately, Broodthaers died before the opening). In 1981, she moved the gallery to its present quarters, at 24 West Fifty-seventh Street. She later discovered Lothar Baumgarten when she hired him to hang the gallery's display at a Düsseldorf art fair.

Marian Goodman Gallery opened its first space in Paris in 1995. In 1999, a permanent exhibition space was opened inside the Hôtel de Montmor, a 17th-century hotel particulier in the Marais district. 

In 2014, the gallery opened an outpost in London, located in an  space over two floors inside a former factory warehouse at Golden Square; the architect David Adjaye renovated the space. At the end of 2020, Goodman announced the London space would close due to the impacts of Brexit and COVID-19 and be replaced by a new initiative, Marian Goodman Projects, that has been conducting exhibits at other locations throughout the city since 2021.

In 2022, Goodman appointed Emily-Jane Kirwan, Rose Lord, Leslie Nolen, Junette Teng and Philipp Kaiser as partners in the Marian Goodman Gallery. The gallery also established an advisory committee of five longtime staff members to support the partners. Also in 2022, the gallery announced that it would expand to Los Angeles by 2023, taking over a  warehouse campus from the 1920s in Hollywood, designed by architectural firm Johnston Marklee & Associates and located at 1120 Seward Street.

Artists
Goodman has stated that she believes a dealer should be committed to working with an artist for fifteen to twenty years. The gallery mostly represents leading non-American artists, including:
 Chantal Akerman
 Eija-Liisa Ahtila
 Giovanni Anselmo
 Christian Boltanski 
 Maurizio Cattelan 
 James Coleman
 Tony Cragg 
 Richard Deacon 
 Tacita Dean
 Rineke Dijkstra
 Pierre Huyghe 
 Amar Kanwar
 William Kentridge
 Steve McQueen 
 Annette Messager
 Gabriel Orozco
 Giuseppe Penone 
 Anri Sala
 Thomas Schütte
 Tino Sehgal
 Thomas Struth
 Mariana Telleria
 Niele Toroni
 Adrián Villar Rojas (since 2015)
 Danh Vo (since 2012)

Kentridge, Struth and Orozco, like most of Goodman's artists, joined her relatively early in their careers. One exception is Richter, who had three exhibitions with Sperone Westwater before deciding to show simultaneously there and with Goodman. After several years of this joint arrangement, he dropped the original gallery.

Goodman also represents American artists, including:
 Andrea Fraser (since 2022)
 Nan Goldin (since 2018)
 Julie Mehretu 
 Maria Nordman 
 Paul Sietsema
 Tavares Strachan (since 2020) 
 Lawrence Weiner 

In addition to living artists, Marian Goodman Gallery also handles the estates of the following: 
 John Baldessari (since 1999)
 Lothar Baumgarten
 Dan Graham 
 Robert Smithson (since 2020)

Marian Goodman Gallery has in the past also represented the following artists:
 Anselm Kiefer
 Sherrie Levine
 Allan McCollum (1980-1984)
 Juan Muñoz (1990-2020)
 Gerhard Richter (1985–2022)
 Allen Ruppersberg 
 Jeff Wall (until 2016)

Reputation
Goodman's friend German theorist and critic Benjamin H. D. Buchloh says, “Her judgment is ultimately aesthetic, but she has a broad understanding of what a privileged existence allows and requires one to do. Her gallery has a certain subtle social horizon of responsibility.” In an article in the New Yorker, art critic Peter Schjeldahl said "Goodman may be the most respected contemporary dealer in New York, for her taste, standards, and loyalty to her artists." Michael Govan, director of Dia Art Foundation, describes her as one of the most powerful and influential dealers of the 20th century.

Described by Artnet as a "very private dealer," Marian Goodman was ranked 22 in ArtReview's guide to the 100 most powerful figures in contemporary art: Power 100, 2010. She is ranked 5th on the list of America's Most Powerful Art Dealers, according to Forbes magazine.

Recognition
In 2012, Goodman received an honorary degree from the CUNY Graduate Center. In 2016 she received the Leo Award, presented by Independent Curators International.

References

External links
 Marian Goodman Gallery
 Marian Goodman Profile in The New Yorker
 2007 Oral History Interview with Marian Goodman

1928 births
Living people
Art museums and galleries in Manhattan
American art dealers
Women art dealers
Emerson College alumni
Little Red School House alumni
People from the Upper West Side